San Luis del Cordero is a city and seat of the municipality of San Luis del Cordero, in the state of Durango, north-western Mexico.  As of 2010, the town of San Luis del Cordero had a population of 1,584.

References

Populated places in Durango